The Hyatt Regency New Orleans is a 32-story, 361-foot (110 m)-tall hotel located at 601 Loyola Ave in the Central Business District of New Orleans, Louisiana. It has 1,193 guest rooms, including 95 suites. It is part of a complex of connected buildings, which includes the Mercedes-Benz Superdome, 1250 Poydras Plaza, Entergy Tower, and the Benson Tower. Originally opened in 1976, it was designed by Welton Becket and Associates. The Hyatt was severely damaged by Hurricane Katrina in 2005 and remained closed for six years, until 2011.

History

Hurricane Katrina damage
The hotel received extensive damage when Hurricane Katrina made landfall in the city on August 29, 2005, where all of the windows of the hotel were blown out due to severe winds, and water and debris were blown into the guestrooms and atrium lobby. There was feces and urine in the lobby, shattered glass everywhere, backed up toilets, and extreme heat, as the air conditioning did not work due to the generator failure. As a result, the guests were evacuated to the ballrooms, along with stranded city residents. On August 31, a convoy of food and supplies provided by Hyatt hotels in Atlanta and Houston arrived. The hotel provided shelter for New Orleans Mayor Ray Nagin, the New Orleans Police Department and Fire Department, the Louisiana National Guard, the Federal Emergency Management Agency (FEMA), the Army Corps of Engineers, and some refugees that managed to sneak in from the Superdome nearby. On September 2, 2005, the approximately 900 hotel guests were evacuated by bus or by car. No guests were suffering from major illnesses or injuries at the time of evacuation.

Temporary Closure and Renovation 
As a result of the damage sustained during Katrina, the hotel remained closed for six years afterwards. The previous hotel owners, Chicago-based company Strategic Hotels and Resorts Inc., along with other investors, announced in early 2006 a plan to redevelop the area around the Superdome (including the adjacent hotel) into a performance art park called the "National Jazz Center". The plan, designed in concept by Pritzker Award-winning architect Thom Mayne, was later abandoned.

Poydras Properties Hotel Holdings acquired the Hyatt from Strategic Hotels & Resorts Inc. for $32 million in 2007.

On February 20, 2009, the State Bond Commission approved $225 million in special low-cost bonds to help renovate the Hyatt Regency.

Hyatt issued a statement in August 2010 announcing a redevelopment effort carrying a price tag of $275 million.

Reopening
The hotel officially reopened on October 19, 2011 with several major changes to its interior and technological additions.

The storm-battered area around the newly rebranded Superdome experienced major construction, renovation, and overall economic changes following Hurricane Katrina, which continued to be supported by the rebuilt Hyatt Regency. The Central Business District’s post-disaster development has yielded both Champions Square, the sports district, and the currently under-construction Biotech District. The entrance to the Hyatt Regency also faces the newly constructed Loyola Streetcar line, which provides access to the French Quarter and rest of the Central Business District (CBD).

The property’s renovation created possibilities for expansion, which materialized in the form of an exhibit hall constructed by re-purposing the hotel’s old porte-cochère, or motor lobby.

Recognition
The Hyatt Regency New Orleans was distinguished by Forbes magazine as one of the Top 10 Hotel Renovations in 2012, due to several notable features, including an in-house restaurant.

See also 
 List of tallest buildings in New Orleans

References

External links 
 Hyatt Regency New Orleans on Emporis.com
 Hyatt Regency New Orleans on Hyatt.com
 Hyatt Regency New Orleans on Nola.com
 Hyatt Regency New Orleans on Forbes.com
 Hyatt Regency New Orleans on Schindler.com
 Hyatt Regency New Orleans on Nola.com
 Hyatt Regency New Orleans on Chron.com

Skyscraper hotels in New Orleans
Hotel buildings completed in 1976
Hotels established in 1976
Buildings and structures with revolving restaurants
1976 establishments in Louisiana
Hyatt Hotels and Resorts